Old Bridge Road is the name of multiple highways in the United States:

 Maryland State Route 707, called Old Bridge Road in West Ocean City
 Virginia State Route 622, called Old Bridge Road in Culpeper County
 Virginia State Route 641, called Old Bridge Road in Prince William County